The Fort Feyzin is a fort built between 1875 and 1877 in Feyzin. It is one of the forts of the second belt of forts around Lyon and more generally the Séré de Rivières fort system. This belt of forts included the forts of Bron, Vancia, Feyzin  and  Mont Verdun.
It currently houses a riding stable managed by the UCPA on behalf of the city of Feyzin.

Characteristics  
Located 230  meters above sea level, it covers a wide area: 22 000 square meters built on 26 wooded hectares, located near the center of  Feyzin-le-haut and the Trois cerisiers recreational center.

History  
The fort was designed to defend Lyon to the south.

Fort Feyzin throughout its history has essentially served as a garrison for the army, and as a gendarmerie. The town became the owner of the fort in July 2003 and now holds tours, of the military road near the caponier, the postern stairs and the ditches, the entrance building and rolling bridge over a ditch, which have been completely renovated as well as a nature walk.

Thanks to the patronage of Foundation Total S.A. the entrance building of the fort has been restored.

Plan of the Fort

The fort today  
The fort of Feyzin is open to the public at the fort bal(l)ade (a one-day event in early summer, held since 2006) and for European Heritage Days.

The fort is the subject of a development program with the creation of a leisure center oriented toward installing an equestrian center, activities like archery and orienteering, the renovation of new facilities and the development of training facilities (fire, police, humanitarian associations ...).

After the renovation of the entrance pavilion in 2008, the equestrian center opened its doors on 27 July 2013. The old stables used by the army were rehabilitated to accommodate from 20 to 30 ponies; a covered carousel  and an open air tiltyard are also present. This equipment is managed and run by the UCPA on behalf of the town of Feyzin. The Bioforce Institute also uses the fort for its training.

See also
Ceintures de Lyon

References

Bibliography

External links  
 Fortiffsere.fr
 Fortiff.be
 Feyzin.passe-simple.over-blog.com
 Total sponsorship Foundation  
  Development Project of the fort of Feyzin  
  Feyzin Equestrian Centre

Séré de Rivières system
Fortifications of Lyon